Roy J. Bostock is an American investor, businessman who served as chairman of Yahoo! Inc. from January 2008 to May 2012. He currently serves on the board of directors of Delta Air Lines. From 2000 to 2001 he served as chairman of the advertising firm BCom3 Group, Inc. He is the former chairman of the Partnership for a Drug-Free America and is a Trustee Emeritus of Duke University.
On 29 July 2020 he was named Chairman of the Board for cellular medicine startup GID BIO Inc., a company that has a potentially break-through treatment for osteoarthritis in late-stage regulatory review.

Early life
Bostock is a 1962 Phi Beta Kappa graduate of Duke, where he was an English Literature major and a member of the varsity baseball and football teams. Bostock also received an MBA from Harvard Business School.

Career
Bostock joined Benton & Bowles in 1964. Following the merger and subsequent creation of D'Arcy Masius Benton & Bowles in 1985, he served as president of the combined company. From 1990 to 1996, he served as chairman and CEO of the company. He also served as chairman and CEO of the McManus Group from 1996 to 2000 and chairman of B/Com3 from 2000 to 2002.

On 6 September 2011 Bostock fired Yahoo CEO Carol Bartz by telephone after stormy weather prevented their scheduled face-to-face meeting. Third Point LLC, which has a 5.2% in Yahoo, called for Bostock's resignation along with the rest of the board for a number of reasons.

Personal life 
Bostock and his wife, Merilee, have donated more than $13 million to Duke University, and are the namesakes of Duke's Bostock Library. These donations include $2 million to Duke Libraries and $5 million to Duke Athletics. He has three children and seven grandchildren. One of his grandchildren is currently attending Duke.

References

External links
 Partnership for Public Service biography

Duke University Trinity College of Arts and Sciences alumni
Harvard Business School alumni
Year of birth missing (living people)
Living people
Directors of Yahoo!
American chairpersons of corporations
Duke University trustees
Delta Air Lines people
American technology chief executives
Directors of Morgan Stanley